Bluefields Historic District is a historic neighborhood in Nashville, Tennessee. It was listed on the National Register of Historic Places listings in Davidson County, Tennessee (NRHP) in 2016.

History
The neighborhood lis located in Donelson, Tennessee neighborhood approximately six miles east of downtown Nashville. There are 247 properties within the district and the majority of them were built in the mid-20th century. The area was first platted from 1929 to 1930. The architecture includes many different styles: Ranch-style houses, Minimal Traditional, and Revival styles that exhibit English Cottage, Colonial, and Tudor architecture influences.

It was developed between 1925 and 1974, and the boundaries of the historic district are 2600–2733 Bluefield Ave., 201-279 Cumberland & 2700–2724 Overhill Circles., and 104-165 Spring Valley Dr. The Bluefields Historic District was added to the National Register of Historic Places listings in Davidson County, Tennessee on March 22, 2016.

References

1925 establishments in Tennessee
National Register of Historic Places in Nashville, Tennessee
Historic districts on the National Register of Historic Places in Tennessee
Neighborhoods in Nashville, Tennessee
Populated places in Davidson County, Tennessee